Paul Faraci is a Democratic member-designate of the Illinois Senate from the 52nd district. The 52nd district includes Champaign, Danville, Rantoul, St. Joseph, and Urbana. Faraci was appointed to succeed Scott Bennett in the 103rd General Assembly.

Early life and work
Faraci was born in Champaign, Illinois to Piero and Flora Faraci, well-regarded Champaign restauranteurs and small business owners (owners of Great Impasta and Jane Addams Book Shop in Downtown Champaign). Faraci later opened and operated his own restaurant in Downtown Champaign, the City of New Orleans. Faraci has worked for the Illinois Department of Commerce and Economic Opportunity and the Illinois Treasurer.

Illinois Senate
On December 9, 2022, Scott Bennett died from complications due to a brain tumor. This created a vacancy for both the remainder of the 102nd General Assembly and the 103rd General Assembly to which Bennett had been elected. Scott Bennett's widow, Stacy, was appointed to fill the remainder of Scott's term in the 102nd General Assembly. On January 7, 2023, Faraci was appointed by the Democratic county party chairpersons of Champaign and Vermilion County to serve in the 103rd General Assembly. He will take office on January 11, 2023.

References 

Illinois state senators
Year of birth missing (living people)
Living people
People from Champaign, Illinois